Marion Township is one of thirteen townships in Putnam County, Indiana. As of the 2010 census, its population was 1,974 and it contained 786 housing units.

Geography

Cities and towns
 Fillmore

Unincorporated towns
 Mount Meridian at 
(This list is based on USGS data and may include former settlements.)

References

External links
 Indiana Township Association
 United Township Association of Indiana

Townships in Putnam County, Indiana
Townships in Indiana